Joseph Angus Mackay (9 September 1882–30 September 1952) was a New Zealand journalist, newspaper editor and historian. He was born in Invercargill, Southland, New Zealand on 9 September 1882.

References

1882 births
1952 deaths
New Zealand editors
New Zealand magazine editors
20th-century New Zealand historians
People from Invercargill
20th-century New Zealand journalists